Clotenus was a legendary king of the Britons as accounted by Geoffrey of Monmouth.  He was preceded by Cledaucus and succeeded by Gurgintius.

References

Legendary British kings
2nd-century BC legendary rulers